Archmail  was a legendary king of the Britons as accounted by Geoffrey of Monmouth.  He was preceded by Beldgabred, his brother, and succeeded by Eldol.

References

Legendary British kings